Michael Lee Moorer (born November 12, 1967) is an American former professional boxer who competed from 1988 to 2008. He won a world championship on four occasions in two weight classes, having held the WBO light heavyweight title from 1988 to 1991; compiling 22 straight KOs in 22 fights and the WBO heavyweight title from 1992 to 1993; the unified WBA, IBF and lineal heavyweight titles in 1994; and regained the IBF heavyweight title again from 1996 to 1997 becoming a three-time heavyweight world champion.

Michael Moorer was an undefeated southpaw in his first 35 professional bouts. He captured the WBO light heavyweight title in 1988 which he defended 9 times. In 1991, Moorer moved up to Heavyweight winning the vacant WBO heavyweight title from Bert Cooper via TKO in 1992. He went on to defeat Evander Holyfield for the unified WBA, IBF and lineal heavyweight titles in 1994. He remains the only southpaw to win the lineal world championship at heavyweight and the only light heavyweight world champion to win a heavyweight world title on more than one occasion.

Moorer is only one of four boxers over the last century that has ever won a version of a world title at both light heavyweight and heavyweight along with Roy Jones Jr., Michael Spinks, and James Toney.

Since retiring from the sport, Moorer has worked as a boxing trainer. In 2009, he worked alongside Freddie Roach at the Wild Card gym in Los Angeles.

Amateur career
Moorer was born in Brooklyn and raised in the small town of Monessen, Pennsylvania. From an early age, Moorer began playing football and was raised by a single mother, who noticed Moorer's unusual hyperactivity. At age 10, Moorer's grandfather, a former New York Golden Gloves Champion who sparred with greats such as Archie Moore, encouraged Moorer to begin training at age 11. Moorer is naturally right-handed, but fought the entirety of his career as a southpaw. Moorer graduated from Monessen High School in 1987, where he starred in football as a linebacker and tight end.

As his amateur career developed, Moorer moved to Detroit, Michigan to train with the legendary Emanuel Steward. In 1986, Moorer was a National Champion for the 156 lb (light middleweight) weight class. At Steward's Kronk Gym, Moorer was known for beating professionals while still an amateur. Moorer also won a bronze medal at the Goodwill Games, and finished his amateur career with a record of 48–16.

Professional career

Light heavyweight
Moorer had a fast rise through the professional boxing ranks. He debuted on March 4, 1988, knocking out Adrian Riggs in the first round. Before the year's end, he was undefeated in eleven bouts (winning all by way of early round knockouts) and fighting for the world title for the first time. He acquired the newly created WBO light heavyweight title with a five-round knockout of Ramzi Hassan.

In 1989, he retained the title six times, beating Freddie Delgado, Frankie Swindell, Mike Sedillo and former WBA champion Leslie Stewart, among others.

In 1990, he retained the title three times before the end of the year, beating Mario Melo and former Michael Spinks challenger Jim McDonald, among others.

Heavyweight
1991 saw Moorer move up to the heavyweight division. He rolled through the competition en route to securing an opportunity to fight for the vacant WBO heavyweight championship the following year against Bert Cooper. Moorer stopped Cooper in the fifth round after both fighters were down and hurt during the bout.

He did not defend the then-lesser regarded WBO heavyweight belt. Moorer and trainer Emanuel Steward parted ways after the Cooper fight. Moorer eventually joined Lou Duva's team, and was trained by Georgie Benton for three fights in 1993, including a 10-round decision win over former champion James "Bonecrusher" Smith.

Moorer then parted ways with the Duvas and Benton, and hired New York-based trainer Teddy Atlas in late 1993. Moorer closed the year with a ten-round decision over Mike Evans.

Unified heavyweight champion

On April 22, 1994, Moorer challenged Evander Holyfield for the lineal, IBF, and WBA title belts. In round 2 Holyfield sent Moorer down on the canvas, but Moorer overcame and went on to win a majority decision. As a result, he became the first-ever southpaw heavyweight champion.

In his first defense of those belts, on November 5, 1994, Moorer faced 45-year-old George Foreman, who lost his last fight for the vacant WBO heavyweight title to Tommy Morrison. For nine rounds, Moorer easily outboxed him, hitting and moving away, while Foreman moving forward, seemingly unable to "pull the trigger" on his punches. Moorer was ahead on all three judges' scorecards entering the 10th round, when Foreman hit him with a number of long-range jabs. Then, suddenly, a short right hand caught Moorer square on his chin, gashing open his bottom lip, and he collapsed to the canvas. Moorer was knocked out and lost the world championship. He also lost his undefeated record. Foreman, at age 45, became the oldest fighter ever to win the world heavyweight title.

The following year, Moorer re-grouped by winning against fringe contender Melvin Foster. Meanwhile, Foreman retained the title with a close and controversial decision against German fighter Axel Schulz.

Because of the controversial nature of the Foreman-Schulz bout, the IBF ordered Foreman to travel to Germany for a rematch, but Foreman refused, choosing to leave the IBF belt vacant instead. South African Francois Botha travelled to Germany instead and beat Schulz with another close decision to claim the title, but he was stripped of it when he tested positive for illegal substances shortly after.

Third heavyweight title reign
Moorer was then given the opportunity to fight Schulz for the vacant crown in Berlin. On June 22, 1996, Moorer won the IBF heavyweight crown once again, beating Schulz by a 12-round split decision.

He became a three-time heavyweight champion; WBO (1992), WBA/IBF (1994) and IBF (1996–1997). When Moorer held the WBO heavyweight title, it wasn't considered an authentic heavyweight title. Ironically, Moorer has always been recognized as a former light heavyweight champion despite only ever holding the WBO title at that weight.

Moorer's first defense came against Botha on November 9, 1996. In a brutal one-sided bout, Moorer, leading on the cards going into the 12th, ended with a flourish, knocking Botha out 18 seconds into the final round.

In March 1997, Moorer retained his belt with a 12-round decision over previously undefeated Vaughn Bean before parting ways with trainer Teddy Atlas, with whom he'd been experiencing increasing tension since the beginning of their professional relationship. He replaced him with Freddie Roach.

Holyfield vs. Moorer II

On November 8, Moorer lost his IBF title in a unification match with WBA champion Evander Holyfield. Moorer was knocked down five times before ringside doctor Flip Homansky advised referee Mitch Halpern to stop the bout in round eight.

Comeback
After this, he retired from boxing for three years before returning with a knockout of journeyman Lorenzo Boyd. Moorer had begun drinking heavily and weighed 270 pounds. During his comeback, he won three more fights, then seemingly retired again when he was knocked out only 30 seconds into round one by David Tua on August 17, 2002. However, he returned to the ring once again on March 29, 2003, beating Otis Tisdale on points over ten rounds. On August 23, 2003, he beat Brazil's Rodolfo Lobo by knockout in only 64 seconds.

After a layoff of almost a year, he returned on July 3, 2004, losing a ten-round unanimous decision to Eliseo Castillo in Miami, Florida. In December of that year, Moorer rallied from a severe deficit on the scorecards to hand former cruiserweight champion Vassiliy Jirov his first knockout loss. He continued fighting, winning all of his bouts against limited opposition. His last fight was a KO win over Shelby Gross in 2008. Following the fight, Moorer retired from professional boxing.

Personal life
Moorer was arrested in 1989 for taking part in a brawl in Charleroi, Pennsylvania.

In 1991, just days after his win over Alex Stewart, Moorer was arrested for assaulting a police officer. Moorer had reportedly been intoxicated at the time of his arrest. The officer he punched suffered a broken jaw. Moorer later was placed on probation and settled the case out of court.

Professional boxing record

See also
List of WBA world champions
List of IBF world champions
List of WBO world champions
List of light heavyweight boxing champions
List of heavyweight boxing champions

References

External links

CBZ Profile
ESPN.com
Michael Moorer: Then and now at Pittsburgh Tribune-Review

African-American boxers
World Boxing Association champions
World Boxing Organization champions
International Boxing Federation champions
People from Monessen, Pennsylvania
1967 births
Living people
American male boxers
World light-heavyweight boxing champions
World heavyweight boxing champions
American boxing trainers
Light-middleweight boxers
Boxers from New York (state)
Competitors at the 1986 Goodwill Games
21st-century African-American people
20th-century African-American sportspeople